Gavan Breen (born 22 January 1935), OAM, also known as J.G. Breen, is an Australian linguist, specialising in the description of Australian Aboriginal languages. He has studied and recorded 49 such languages.

Life

Early life
Breen was born at St Arnaud in the Wimmera district of the state of Victoria on 22 January 1935. He received his secondary education at St Patrick's College, Ballarat (1948–1952), where he matriculated as Dux in his final year. He went on to study at Newman College, graduating as a metallurgist from Melbourne University.

Career
He was thinking of somewhere to take a holiday break and a job when, in 1967, he chanced to listen to a public lecture at his university in which the need to record dying languages was mentioned. The work was well paid, and Breen took a grant to do a master's degree at Monash University, working initially with the last speakers of the Warluwarra language, and later with the Woorabinda people, before deciding that this was where his vocation lay. He was appointed a research fellow at Monash, and there worked on the Bidjara and :sv:Gungabula languages and Pitta Pitta with Barry Blake.

Breen's work, which has extended over many distinct language groups in western and central Queensland, the Northern Territory and South Australia, was mostly done under the auspices of the AIATSIS, of which he is now a member. He has studied and recorded 49 such languages. Tasaku Tsunoda has suggested that, having worked with literally dozens of individuals who were the last speakers of a variety of Australian languages, Breen can be said to be the last speaker of the languages he has described, since he retains a working knowledge, if partial, of an otherwise extinct language.

"Retirement"
Although Breen officially retired in 2001, he continued to work at the Institute for Aboriginal Development in Alice Springs and was still there . He has also offered his expertise in legal cases, helping native peoples establish their claims to native title.

On 26 January 2016, Breen was awarded the Officer of the Order of Australia.

Salvaged languages
Languages Breen has helped to salvage include:

 Warluwarra
 Bidjara.
 Gungabula.
 The Antekerrepenhe dialect of Upper Arrernte.
 The Mayabic languages and dialects.
 The Yalarnnga language.
 The Innamincka dialect of Yandruwandha.

Selected works

Notes and references

Notes

References

1935 births
Linguists from Australia
Living people